Baltimore Design School is a public charter middle/high school located in Baltimore, Maryland, United States. The school occupies the former Lebow Brothers Clothing Factory in the Greenmount West neighborhood, part of the Station North Arts and Entertainment District. The school was modeled on, and intended to complement, the Baltimore School for the Arts, which focuses on the performing arts. By contrast, Baltimore Design School's stated aim is to provide its students with "a solid foundation of design and studio skills followed by intensive academics and design study", by completion of four years of study in one of three tracks in architecture-construction design and management, graphic design-interactive media production, or fashion design, followed by three years of CTE training.

History
The industrial building that would eventually become the Baltimore Design School was built between 1915 and 1916 as part of the Crown Cork & Seal Co.  From there, it passed into the hands of the Lebow Brothers Clothing factory, which occupied the site until 1985, when the building was closed during a labor dispute.   After that, the building sat vacant for nearly 30 years.  Portions of the abandoned factory were used for scenes in the fourth season of The Wire.  The redevelopment was a product of a public-private partnership between Seawall Development Co., Baltimore City Public Schools and the school organization.

References

External links
 School Website
 Baltimore Design School at Baltimore City Schools

Public schools in Baltimore
Public high schools in Maryland
Art schools in Maryland
Greenmount West, Baltimore